Colegio San José may refer to:
 Colegio San José, Arequipa, Peru, a Jesuit boys' school
 Colegio San José, Río Piedras, PR, a boys college preparatory school
 Colegio San José, San Germán, PR, a co-educational college preparatory school
Colegio San José (Asunción), a school in Paraguay